Marche Verte (English: Green March) is the aerobatic demonstration team of the Royal Moroccan Air Force and the official aerobatic team of Morocco. Named for the 1975 "Green March", the team was formed in 1988 when French pilot Jean-Pierre Otelli was tasked with establishing an aerobatic team. Initially, the team consisted of only two planes. In the course of time this was increased to seven.

For aerobatic display purposes the team uses the French built trainer Avions Mudry & Cie CAP 232. The support plane is a twin-turbo-prop CASA CN-235.

Fleet
 7 Avions Mudry & Cie CAP 232
 1 CASA CN-235

See also 
 Royal Moroccan Air Force
 History of Western Sahara

External links 
 Marche Verte
 Text&clip

Royal Moroccan Air Force
Aerobatic teams